Persido stands for Persatuan Sepakbola Indonesia Donggala (en: Football Association of Indonesia Donggala). Persido Donggala is an Indonesian football club based in Donggala Regency, Central Sulawesi. Club played at Liga 3.

Honours
 Liga 3 Central Sulawesi
 Champion: 2018

References

External links
Persido Donggala at Liga-Indonesia.co.id

Football clubs in Indonesia
Football clubs in Central Sulawesi